Hildegarde's shrew (Crocidura hildegardeae) is a species of mammal in the family Soricidae. It is found in Burundi, Cameroon, Central African Republic, Republic of the Congo, Democratic Republic of the Congo, Ethiopia, Kenya, Rwanda, and Tanzania. Considered by some authorities to be a subspecies of Crocidura gracilipes, it is now recognised as a separate species, with a diploid chromosome number of 2n = 52. This is one of three species of small mammal named by the British zoologist Oldfield Thomas in honour of anthropologist Hildegarde Beatrice Hinde.

Description
The hairs on the back, which are longer on the rump than elsewhere, are mid-brown with darker tips, giving an overall pelage the colour of milk chocolate. The underparts are pale brown, and the limbs are dark brown, with the exception of the inner side of the hind limbs which are yellowish-brown. The tail is long (about 70% of the head-and-body length) and is partially furred, being black above and brown below.

Distribution and habitat
This Central and East African species is known from Cameroon and north of the River Congo in the Republic of the Congo and the Democratic Republic of the Congo, eastwards to Kenya and Tanzania. In Rwanda, its habitats include moist savanna and cultivated areas. It occurs in both primary forest and secondary growth. The International Union for Conservation of Nature has assessed its conservation status as being of "least concern".

Ecology
This shrew is nocturnal. Breeding takes place in July and August, with litters typically numbering two young. The predators of this shrew include small carnivorous mammals and the viper Atheris nitschei.

References 

Hildegarde's shrew
Fauna of Central Africa
Mammals of Rwanda
Mammals of Burundi
Mammals of Kenya
Mammals of Uganda
Mammals of Tanzania
Hildegarde's shrew
Taxa named by Oldfield Thomas
Taxonomy articles created by Polbot